Balaji Telefilms is an Indian company that produces Indian soap operas, reality TV, comedy, game shows, entertainment, and factual programming in several Indian languages. Balaji Telefilms is promoted by Ekta Kapoor and Shobha Kapoor and is a public company listed at Bombay Stock Exchange and National Stock Exchange of India.

In the 2000s the company went on to produce some historic blockbusters which include, Kyunki Saas Bhi Kabhi Bahu Thi, Kahaani Ghar Ghar Kii, Kaahin Kissii Roz,  Kasautii Zindagii Kay, Kahiin to Hoga, Kkusum and Kasamh Se amongst several others.

In the 2010s the company went on to produce several hugely successful drama series which includes Pavitra Rishta, Tere Liye, Pyaar Kii Ye Ek Kahaani, Bade Achhe Lagte Hain, Jodha Akbar, Yeh Hai Mohabbatein, Kumkum Bhagya, Meri Aashiqui Tum Se Hi, Kasam Tere Pyaar Ki, Kundali Bhagya, Yeh Hai Chahatein and Bhagya Lakshmi.

Since 2015, the company introduced several seasonal format weekend drama thriller series which went out to be highly rated series amongst which includes Naagin (TV series) (running currently in its 6th season), Kavach (TV series) (2 seasons), Brahmarakshas (2 seasons), Haiwaan : The Monster, Daayan (TV series) and Qayamat Ki Raat amongst several others.

In 2017, the company launched its biography, Kingdom of the Soap Queen: The Story of Balaji Telefilms.

History
The company is registered as 'Balaji Telefilms Private Limited' on 11th of November 1994 in Mumbai, India, with the objective of creating serials and other entertainment content by Ekta Kapoor and Shobha Kapoor. Balaji has specialized in formatted programming that can be adapted for languages around the nation as well as abroad. One notable success Kyunki Saas Bhi Kabhi Bahu Thi. Other examples include Kahaani Ghar Ghar Kii, Kaahin Kissii Roz, Kahiin to Hoga,Kasautii Zindagii Kay,  Kkusum, Kutumb, Kohi Apna Sa, Kasamh Se, Pavitra Rishta, Parichay, Kya Hua Tera Vaada, Jodha Akbar, Bade Achhe Lagte Hain, Yeh Hai Mohabbatein, Naagin, Kumkum Bhagya and Kundali Bhagya The later five are dubbed and re-produced in several languages across India and Asia. In recent years the company has been expanding its reality show output with shows such as titles such as Box Cricket League on Sony TV.

Balaji was incorporated as a public limited company on 29 February 2000, and its name was changed to 'Balaji Telefilms Ltd' on 19 April 2000. The company made public issue of 28,00,000 equity shares of 10 each at a premium of 120 aggregating 36.40 crore. The issue included a book-built portion of 25,20,000 equity shares and a fixed price portion of 2,80,000 equity shares. In the same year, Nine Network Entertainment India Pvt. Ltd, a wholly-owned subsidiary of Nine Broadcasting India Pvt. Ltd., merged with Balaji Telefilms Ltd. During 2000–04 the stock market capitalization grew sixteenfold to 571 crores when Star India acquired a 26% stake in the business.

Balaji Telefilms started a media training institute in 2010. Known as ICE Institute of Creative Excellence, it trains students in acting, cinematography, direction, modelling, etc.

In 2014, the company and Ekta Kapoor were subject to protests in Jaipur led by the Shri Rajput Karni Sena (SRKS), a Hindutva group. These occurred because of perceived communal slights in the Jodha Akbar television series.

In 2015, Balaji Telefilms produced a finite series, Naagin, which became the most viewed show on Indian television since its inception. The show won multiple awards and returned for its second and third season, which also generated high ratings. The fourth season of series was broadcast starting in December 2019 but it was not doing well on television so it was replaced by the fifth season of the series in August 2020.

In 2017, Reliance Industries acquired a 25% stake in Balaji Telefilms for Rs413 crore. The deal gave RIL access to Balaji Telefilms’ content for use by telecom unit Reliance Jio.

Current productions

Upcoming productions

Former productions

Audio

Hindi

Regional

See also
 ALT Balaji – on-demand video content app launched by Balaji Telefilms Limited in April 2017
 Balaji Motion Pictures – a subsidiary of Balaji Telefilms Limited that produces and distributes motion pictures
 List of accolades received by Balaji Telefilms

References

External links
 

 
Film production companies based in Mumbai
Indian dubbing studios
Television production companies of India
Indian companies established in 1994
Entertainment companies established in 1994
1994 establishments in Maharashtra
Companies listed on the National Stock Exchange of India
Companies listed on the Bombay Stock Exchange